Ziyarat Boneh (also Romanized as Zīyārat Boneh; also known as Zenāghī (Persian: زناغي)) is a village in Gavkan Rural District, in the Central District of Rigan County, Kerman Province, Iran. At the 2006 census, its population was 24, in 4 families.

References 

Populated places in Rigan County